The 2018 Waterloo Region municipal elections were held on October 22, 2018 in the Regional Municipality of Waterloo, Ontario, Canada, to elect Waterloo Regional Council, the mayors and city councils of Cambridge, Kitchener, North Dumfries, Waterloo, Wellesley, Wilmot, and Woolwich, the Waterloo Region District School Board (Public), the Waterloo Catholic District School Board, and the regional members of Conseil Scolaire de District Catholiques Centre-Sud and Conseil Scolaire Viamonde (Public). The election was held in conjunction with the province wide 2018 municipal elections.

Names in bold denotes elected candidates.
(X) denotes incumbent.

Waterloo Regional Council

Chair

The election for Regional Chair was marked by the departure of Ken Seiling, who served 33 years as chair. Karen Redman ran with experience as a regional councillor and former Member of Parliament for Kitchener Centre. Also running were a former mayor of the North Dumfries Rob Deutschmann, who as mayor also served as a regional councillor, former councillor in the lower-tier municipality of the City of Waterloo Jan d'Ailly, and businessman Jay Aissa, both of whom overperformed in the City of Cambridge.

The CBC received responses on priorities from each candidate. Redman ran on a message of both economic development and some progressive priorities, including opioid, mental health and social housing issues. Deutschmann ran on a similar tone on issues, with an additional focus on increasing funding to police and emergency response services. d'Ailly ran on a progressive platform, with emphasis placed on the opioid crisis, inclusionary zoning, increasing social supports, reducing deaths due to automobiles, and increasing economic progressivity in the taxation and benefit structure of the Region's finances. Aissa ran on construction of a new hospital, fiscal conservatism, increasing geographic access of rapid transit to less-served municipalities, road state of repair and increasing funding to police and other first responders

Redman won majorities in all seven cities and municipalities of Waterloo Region, including North Dumfries, where Deutschmann served as mayor. Results were slow, with official results not announced until two days after the election, not due to a close ballot count, but due to province-wide technical issues with the electronic voting system that required some extensions to voting in certain areas in the Region.

Council
Waterloo Regional Council includes the chair, the mayors of the seven constituent municipalities (see below) plus the following council races:

Cambridge

Referendum
Referendum on ranked ballots: "Are you in favour of the City of Cambridge using a ranked ballot system for the 2022 municipal election?"

As the only 27.27% of eligible voters voted in the referendum, the results are non binding.

List of candidates:

Mayor

Cambridge City Council

By-election
Following the death of Frank Monteiro, a by-election was held in Ward 7 on October 5, 2020:

Kitchener
List of candidates:

Mayor

Kitchener City Council

North Dumfries

Mayor

Waterloo
List of candidates:

Mayor

Waterloo City Council

Wellesley

Mayor

Wilmot

Mayor

Woolwich

Mayor

References 

Waterloo
Politics of the Regional Municipality of Waterloo